The Fil da Rueun is a mountain of the Glarus Alps, overlooking Pigniu in the canton of Graubünden. The mountain lies between the Val da Pigniu (west) and Val da Siat (east).

References

External links
 Fil da Rueun on Hikr

Mountains of the Alps
Mountains of Switzerland
Mountains of Graubünden
Two-thousanders of Switzerland